Andrey Alexandrovich Pozdnukhov, better known by his stage name Bledny (born November 7, 1976, Tara, Omsk, RSFSR, USSR) is a Russian rap artist, founder and member of the 25/17 group, and a former member of the Mercury group.

Biography 
In 1998, Pozdnukhov became a member of the Mercury group, which performed gangsta rap. They released several albums and gained some fame in Omsk. It was around this time when he would also begin his own label, Ambush Production, although it would only last until 2010.  

At the end of 2012, Pozdunknov starred in a video aimed at drawing attention to discrimination against people with an HIV infection. In 2019, he noted that the operations of the "25/17" group would temporarily suspend, although in 2020 the group reemerged and would continue to release music until the present day. In 2022, they released the album, "Overcome" (Odolyen), featuring a cover of Soviet rock musician Viktor Tsoi's song "April"[rus]

Personal life
Pozdnukhov has been married twice. He met his second wife when he was doing state practice in fine arts at the gymnasium, where she studied in the eleventh grade. In 2003 they celebrated their wedding. On March 15, 2011, a son was born - Yaroslav. On November 6, 2014, Stanislav's daughter was born. Pozdnukhov professes the faith of Protestant Christianity.

Discography

In Mercury
 1999 — First Mercury
 2000 — Blue

In "25/17" (formerly "Ezekiel 25:17")

Studio Albums 
 2004  - The word of honor of the third dungeon
 2008  - Ambush. Stronger than steel
 2009  - Only for their own
 2010  - Zebra
 2012  - Songs of Love and Death
 2014  - Russian plantain
 2017  - Eve goes to Babylon
 2022 - Inevitability
 2022 - Room. housewarming
 2022 - Overcome

Mini-Albums 
 2010  - The power of resistance (together with " GROT ")
 2010  - Black stripe
 2011  - Off season
 2013  - Evil Days
 2015  - Steam
 2016  - Just
 2017  - Die of happiness (together with Andrey Kit )
 2020  - Tales from the Crypt
 2020  - Tales from the Crypt 2
 2020 - Tales from the Crypt 3

Mixtapes 
 2007  - Life U (together with DJ Navvy)
 2008  - Alloys (together with DJ Navvy)

Compilations 

 2012  - On the wave
 2013  - Logbook (10 years on the wave. Live)

Maxi singles and promo releases 

 2005  - So it was nada
 2008  - Hold on tight (with DJ Navvy)
 2010  - Spring for everyone!

Singles 

 2009  - On the city map
 2009  - My weapon (p.o. FAQ)
 2009  - T.D.S.
 2010  - Dog
 2010  - No one can stop me
 2011  - Fire
 2012  - Russian
 2013 - Inside a broken head
 2014 - Until the lights are turned off
 2014 - Rahunok
 2014 - Name of names
 2015 - Under the Gypsy Sun (Acoustic version)
 2015 - The whole world goes to war with me
 2015 - Networks (p.u. Branimir)
 2015 - Goldfinches
 2015 - Alive
 2016  - "Hot Weekdays" (In memory of Anatoly Krupnov)
 2016  - Siberian march (Kalinov bridge cover)
 2017  - She is not like everyone else
 2017  - Room
 2022 - Rossimon
 2022 - Culture

In Ice 9 project

Studio albums

 2011  - Cold War
 2013  - Temptation of a holy commoner (album) | Temptation of a holy commoner
 2019  - Deafening silence

Singles 

 2011  - Even worse
 2013  - Fire
 2013  - 999
 2013  - Furnace

See also 

 Russian hip hop
 Husky (rapper)
 Jeeep (rapper)

References 

Russian rappers
Living people
1976 births
Russian hip hop
Russian hip hop musicians